Cheshmeh Sefid (also Romanized as Cheshmeh Sefīd) is a village in Tarhan-e Gharbi Rural District, Tarhan District, Kuhdasht County, Lorestan Province, Iran. At the 2006 census, its population was 1,376, in 252 families.

References 

Towns and villages in Kuhdasht County